= Mashdi ebad =

1953 film

- Directed by: Samad Sabahi
- Written by: Samad Sabahi
- Produced by: Azizollah Kordvani
- Cinematography: Nuri Habib
- Production company: Asre Talaie
- Release date: 29 April 1953
- Running time: 120 minutes
- Country: Iran
- Language: Azeri

Mashdi ebad is a 1953 Azerbaijanian musical comedy film directed by Samad Sabahi.

== Cast ==
- Ali Tabesh
- Asghar Tafakori
- Taghi Zohuri
